Peter Chung Hoan Ting (born 10 September 1928) was the metropolitan archbishop of the Roman Catholic Archdiocese of Kuching, Malaysia from 1976 to 2003, the first archbishop of the diocese.

Chung entered the diocesan minor seminary of the Diocese of Laohekou in 1940. In 1947, he entered the Regional Major Seminary at Hankou. However, in 1949, during the communist insurgency, the entire seminary was moved to Hong Kong and later to Macau. In 1954, he graduated from the seminary and arrived in Kuching for his priestly ordination on 26 September. He was ordained by Bishop John Vos and became the first priest to be ordained in Sarawak. In 1966, he was sent to study canon law in Rome and obtained a Doctorate of Canon Law.

On 1 September 1970, Pope Paul VI appointed Chung as Coadjutor Vicar Apostolic of Kota Kinabalu and Titular Bishop of Acelum. He was consecrated in Kota Kinabalu by Bishop James Buis on 15 November 1970. In 1972, he became the Vicar Apostolic of Kota Kinabalu.

On 30 January 1975, Chung was appointed as Vicar Apostolic of Kuching. The Ecclesiastical Province of East Malaysia was established and Apostolic Vicariate of Kuching was raised to be an archdiocese and Chung became its first archbishop on 31 May 1975. On 21 June 2003, he retired and handed over the archdiocese to his auxiliary bishop, John Ha Tiong Hock.

References

External links 

Catholic-Hierarchy.org 

Living people
1928 births
20th-century Roman Catholic bishops in Malaysia
20th-century Roman Catholic archbishops in Malaysia
21st-century Roman Catholic archbishops in Malaysia
Bishops appointed by Pope Paul VI
People from Xiangyang
Malaysian Roman Catholic archbishops